The Zuckerman helmet, officially designated the Civilian Protective Helmet, was a British helmet designed for use by civil defence organisations and the general public during World War II. It was researched and designed by Solly Zuckerman, Derman Christopherson and Hugh Cairns.

Background
Zuckerman and Cairns first started looking into a design for a helmet to aid civil defence in the mid-1940. Their aim was to provide a helmet that could deal with impact from falling and flying masonry and provide more coverage for the head and the neck areas.

After the War Office accepted their design, the Civilian Protective Helmet went into circulation in December 1940 and throughout 1941, the vast majority therefore being dated 1941.

Production
Helmets were made from pressed mild steel or manganese steel (known for its impact resistance) in two sizes only and sometimes marked with either M (medium) or L (large) on the inside of the brim. The design of the high dome was to allow the helmet to withstand impact and still protect the wearer. Many have two single holes opposite each other on the brim. The marking details the amount of resistance the helmet offered to ballistic impact (that being the lowest and therefore not for use as a frontline helmet). The helmet was available in a number of colours: white, black, grey and olive green.

A helmet liner made of leather and webbing was attached to the helmet with string, lace or leather thong that was threaded through 16 pre-drilled slightly angled holes around the helmet to hold it in place. Small loops were incorporated on the helmet for attaching a chinstrap, but no official strap was issued though many used the Mk II helmet chinstrap. Consequently, helmets can be found with numerous chin strap variations.

The helmet was manufactured by a number of companies such as the Austin Motor Co. and Morris Motors.

Gallery

Service
Zuckerman helmets were issued to Civil Defence personnel such as Fire Guards, Street Fire Parties and factory workers. They were also on sale to the general public for 5 shillings and sixpence (5s 6d). 

When used by Fire Guards and Street Fire Party personnel, the helmets were marked accordingly with FG or SFP. Bands around the helmet (often in black) would denote seniority within the Fire Guard service.

The fire service declined to use the Zuckerman helmet since it preferred the Mk II helmet.

References

External links 
 Film of Zuckerman helmet being worn by Fire Guards in World War 2

Combat helmets of the United Kingdom
World War II military equipment of the United Kingdom